The State Register of Heritage Places is maintained by the Heritage Council of Western Australia. , 35 places are heritage-listed in the Shire of Cranbrook, of which one is on the State Register of Heritage Places, the Tenterden Agricultural Hall, a building destroyed by bush fire on 27 December 2003.

List

State Register of Heritage Places
The Western Australian State Register of Heritage Places, lists the following state registered place within the Shire of Cranbrook:

Shire of Cranbrook heritage-listed places
The following places are heritage listed in the Shire of Cranbrook but are not State registered:

References

Cranbrook
Great Southern (Western Australia)